Opopanax ("the juice of all-heal") can refer to:

Plants 
 Opopanax, a genus in the family Apiaceae
 Vachellia farnesiana, a species in the family Fabaceae

Gum resins 
 Perfumery's opopanax, the oleo-gum-resin of Commiphora guidottii
 The oleo-gum-resin of Commiphora kataf (syn. C. holtziana, C. erythraea),  sometimes sold under the name of opoponax
 True opopanax, the gum resin of Opopanax chironium or other Opopanax species

Literature 
 L'Opoponax, the 1964 novel in French by Monique Wittig